Bentonville Schools is a comprehensive community school district serving students in kindergarten through 12th grade from Bentonville, Arkansas, in Benton County. Bentonville Schools encompasses  of land, including most of Bentonville, and portions of Bella Vista, Cave Springs, Centerton, Gravette, Highfill, Little Flock, Rogers, and Springdale.

As of the 2019-2020 school year, the district's 22 schools have a total enrollment of some 18,000 students and 1300 certified staff members. Bentonville Schools has grown dramatically in the last decade and is now one of the largest districts (by student population) in the state.

History

In response to the Uvalde school shooting of 2022 there was more of a demand for armed guards. In 2022 the Bentonville School District administrators stated that they increased security but that it was not feasible to hire armed guards for all campuses due to difficulties in hiring and in loaning police officers from police departments.

Schools

As of the 2019-2020 school year, Bentonville Schools operates 22 schools. An additional junior high school will open in fall of 2020.

Elementary Schools (Grade K–4)
The following information is based on 2019-2020 school year data available from the Bentonville School District website. All schools are located in Bentonville unless otherwise designated:
 Apple Glen
 Centerton Gamble; located in Centerton
 Central Park
 Cooper; located in Bella Vista 
 Elm Tree
 Evening Star
 Mary Mae Jones
 Osage Creek
 R. E. Baker 
 Sugar Creek 
 Thomas Jefferson 
 Willowbrook

Middle Schools (Grade 5–6)

The following information is based on 2013–14 school year data available from the Bentonville School District website. All schools are located in Bentonville unless otherwise designated:
 Ardis Ann
 Bright Field 
 Creekside
 Old High
 Ruth Barker

Junior High Schools (Grade 7–8)
The following information is based on 2019–20 school year data available from the Bentonville School District website. All schools are located in Bentonville unless otherwise designated:
 Fulbright
Grimsley; located in Centerton.
 Lincoln 
 Washington

High Schools (Grade 9–12)

The following information is based on 2013–14 school year data available from the Bentonville School District website. All schools are located in Bentonville unless otherwise designated:
 Bentonville High School 
 Bentonville West High School; located in Centerton.

References

External links 
 

School districts in Arkansas
Education in Benton County, Arkansas
Rogers, Arkansas
Springdale, Arkansas